Brachicoma is a genus of true flies in the family Sarcophagidae.

Species
B. asiatica Rohdendorf & Verves, 1979
B. borealis Ringdahl, 1932
B. devia (Fallén, 1820)
B. nigra Chao & Zhang, 1988
B. papei Verves, 1990
B. sarcophagina (Townsend, 1891)
B. setosa Coquillett, 1902

References 

Sarcophagidae
Schizophora genera
Diptera of Asia
Taxa named by Camillo Rondani